Stefan Nacke (born 24 January 1976) is a German sociologist and politician of the Christian Democratic Union (CDU) who has been serving as a member of the Bundestag since 2021.

Early life and education
Nacke was born 1976 in the West German city of Münster and studied sociology.

Political career
Nacke entered the CDU in 1998.

From the 2017 state elections, Nacke served as a member of the State Parliament of North Rhine-Westphalia. He was his parliamentary group’s spokesperson for science policy.

Nacke became a member of the Bundestag in the 2021 elections, representing the Münster district. In parliament, he has since been serving on the Committee on Labour and Social Affairs.

Other activities
 Max Planck Institute for Molecular Biomedicine, Member of the Board of Trustees (since 2019)

References 

Living people
1976 births
Christian Democratic Union of Germany politicians
Members of the Bundestag 2021–2025
21st-century German politicians
People from Münster